The Carole and Barry Kaye Performing Arts Auditorium is a theater in Boca Raton, Florida on the campus of Florida Atlantic University. The 2,400-seat hall was constructed in 1980 and opened in 1982.

External links
 Official website

Theatres in Florida
Florida Atlantic University
Buildings and structures in Boca Raton, Florida
Theatres completed in 1982
Tourist attractions in Palm Beach County, Florida
1982 establishments in Florida